Samuel "Sam" March (1861-10 August 1935) was a British trade union official and Labour Party politician active in the Poplar area of London.

A member of Poplar Borough Council from 1906 until 1927, he was Mayor of Poplar in 1920–21. During his mayoral term he was jailed for taking part in the Poplar Rates Rebellion.

He stood for parliament for the constituency of Poplar South at the 1918 general election but was not elected.
At the next general election in 1922 he was elected to the House of Commons and held the seat at the next three elections, standing down in 1931.

He was also a member of the London County Council for Poplar South from 1919 to 1925.

He died at his home in East Ham aged 74.

References

External links 
 

1861 births
1935 deaths
UK MPs 1922–1923
UK MPs 1923–1924
UK MPs 1924–1929
UK MPs 1929–1931
Labour Party (UK) MPs for English constituencies
Members of London County Council
Members of Poplar Metropolitan Borough Council
Mayors of places in Greater London
Transport and General Workers' Union-sponsored MPs